Stephen Earl Wilson (born October 16, 1948) is an American former basketball player who played the shooting guard position. He played college basketball for Hanover before playing in the American Basketball Association (ABA) as a member of the Denver Rockets from 1970 to 1972.

Wilson attended Brookville High School before joining Hanover College in Hanover, Indiana. During his senior year, he averaged 20.3 points and 6.9 rebounds per game. He left the school as its fourth-leading scorer with a career total of 1,641 points for an average of 15.2 points per game and was drafted by the Cleveland Cavaliers in the sixteenth round (227th overall pick) of the 1970 NBA draft.

References

External links
 

1948 births
Living people
American men's basketball players
Basketball players from Indiana
Cleveland Cavaliers draft picks
Hanover Panthers men's basketball players
Denver Rockets players
Shooting guards
Sportspeople from Richmond, Indiana